Dingaka is a 1965 film by South African director Jamie Uys with the soundtrack by Bertha Egnos, Eddie Domingo and Basil Gray.

Synopsis
Dingaka tells the story of a tribesman, Ntuku Makwena, who avenges the murder of his daughter according to traditional tribal laws. His act of revenge leads him to be tried under government laws, where justice for black people does not exist.

Cast
The film stars Ken Gampu, Stanley Baker, Juliet Prowse and Bob Courtney.

External links
 http://www.rottentomatoes.com/m/dingaka/
 
 
 http://www.soundtrackcollector.com/catalog/soundtrackdetail.php?movieid=36833

Films directed by Jamie Uys
1965 films
1965 drama films
CinemaScope films
Afrikaans-language films
English-language South African films
Films set in Africa
South African drama films